"Kids" is a song by American rock band MGMT. It was released as the third and final single from their debut studio album Oracular Spectacular (2007) on October 13, 2008. The version of the song that appears on Oracular Spectacular is updated from earlier versions that appear on the band's EPs Time to Pretend (2005) and We (Don't) Care (2004). A track entitled "Kids (Afterschool Dance Megamix)" appears on the album Climbing to New Lows (2005). On December 1, 2009, the track was announced as a nominee at the 52nd Grammy Awards in the category Best Pop Performance by a Duo or Group with Vocals.

The song was the center of a legal dispute with the former President of France, Nicolas Sarkozy, over the "insulting" compensation he offered for his illegal use of the song during a party conference.

Music videos

Student assignment video 
A video made by University of Southern California student Jon Salmon was created in December 2007 as a student assignment and uploaded to YouTube the following month. The video features fellow students Abby Fuller and Rafael Pulido lip-syncing to the song and frequently cuts to various clips from other YouTube videos featuring people dancing. It has since been viewed more than 52 million times on YouTube as of June 2020. MGMT later invited the participants to join them for the official video of "Electric Feel".

Official video 

On June 3, 2009, MGMT released the official music video for "Kids". It was directed by Ray Tintori, who directed MGMT's previous videos for "Time to Pretend" and "Electric Feel." The video was released to the Oracular Spectacular version.

The video follows a toddler menaced by monsters that his inattentive mother (played by Joanna Newsom) cannot see. It begins with a quote against a background of fire. The quote ("Beware that, when fighting monsters, you yourself do not become a monster... for when you gaze long into the abyss. The abyss gazes also into you.."), attributed to Mark Twain, is actually from Friedrich Nietzsche's Beyond Good and Evil. Then, a crudely designed countdown sequence from five to one plays, with a rapid set of fuzzy, low-quality pictures of children in the background. After that, the toddler is seen in his crib, as monsters suddenly appear and show their claws at him. He is then picked up by his mother and she walks out of the house, then down the street, while the child sees humans as bloody monsters. His mother then places him down and he begins to walk down the street, and then begins to run and cry in fear of the monsters. The toddler smiles as he comes across the band performing the song in futuristic costumes. The toddler gains an MGMT headband before being returned to his mother by a monster policeman, and his mother discards the headband. As his mother drives him home, the toddler sees monsters outside and on a TV. The video shifts from live-action to animation, and the van is revealed to be a scab on a naked woman. Various surreal things happen in the animated world. The video ends with the boy running from a monster and then climbing onto the hand of a giant Andrew VanWyngarden. The boy happily waves his arms at VanWyngarden, but he turns into a monster and the boy is eaten.

The video has been criticized for its treatment of the toddler who appears to be truly frightened throughout the video, although it is stated on the MGMT website, "No children were harmed in the making of this video." Stereogum noted that the video "essentially polarized everyone old enough (but not too old) to know what the internet is."  While MTV noted that "They really don’t make videos like this any more … mostly for legal reasons", the band later released a "behind the scenes" video through their official YouTube channel that shows the toddler laughing while interacting with the puppets and actors in monster costumes.  The animated sequence was done by Christy Karacas, director of the Superjail! TV series, as well as Henry Thurlow and Lizzi Akana. As of February 2023, the music video has received over 167 million views on YouTube. The video was featured on the eighth season premiere of Beavis and Butt-head, "Werewolves of Highland".

Reception
The single peaked at number 9 on the US Billboard Alternative Songs chart, where "Time to Pretend" had previously peaked at number 23. NME named it the number-one song on its list of the Best Singles of 2008.  In October 2011, NME placed it at number 99 on its list "150 Best Tracks of the Past 15 Years".  Rolling Stone named it number 46 on its list of 100 Best Songs of the 2000s. Rolling Stone'''s Kevin O'Donnell described the song as, "a noisy New Order-style synth jam."

Two months after exiting the UK Top 40, the song was featured in an advertisement for the BBC1 program Waterloo Road. From this the song gained renewed interest, re-entering the UK Top 40, and on January 16, 2009, the song reached its highest position to date of number 16. "Kids" came in at number 5 on Australia's Triple J Hottest 100 countdown for 2008. In 2013, the song was voted at number 64 on the same station's Hottest 100 from the past 20 years.

The single received considerable airplay in the U.S., UK, Ireland and Australia before the release date, charting in the UK, Ireland and Australia. In Australia, "Kids" debuted before the release date at number 89, and it peaked at number 30, playing on radio stations like Nova. A Soulwax remix of the song was played heavily on UK radio ahead its official release as well. The song got to the number one spot on VG-lista, the Norwegian chart, based on downloads alone. This made some controversy about how reliable the chart was, as the song had not been playlisted on any major radio stations and it disappeared from the chart the next week.

In popular culture
"Kids" was selected for the soundtrack for the video game FIFA 09. The song was also featured in the Quiksilver and Red Bull snowboarding film, That's It, That's All, and as the final song in Taylor Steele's surf movie Stranger Than Fiction. Other appearances can be found in episode 6 the BBC's Survivors, as the trailer song in the documentary American Teen, a trailer for Channel 4 show Big Art, the skiing film Reasons, the 2008 film American Teen, a trailer for the 2010 film Twelve, in the second episode of Paris Hilton's British Best Friend, in season 2 episode 19 of Gossip Girl, "The Grandfather", and the TLC reality series Jon & Kate Plus 8. The Soulwax remix is a part of the soundtrack of Forza Horizon 4. Alex Metric remixed the song for eFootball PES 2020. It also appeared on FIFA 23, as part of the game’s Ultimate FIFA Soundtrack (a compilation of 40 songs from past FIFA games).

The song has also made appearances as background music in the fourth and fifth series of the BBC One British drama Waterloo Road, on the BBC Three show The Real Hustle, BBC daytime show Homes Under the Hammer and in the Staples Center at X Games XV. It is also featured in the pilot episode of The Vampire Diaries, played near the end of the 2009 film Whip It, and in the fifth episode of the third season of The Secret Life of the American Teenager. In the seventh series of Shameless, part of the song was briefly played in one of the episodes. Nokia promoted their then-newest phone, the Nokia N8, using a remix of the song.

Kids is also featured prominently in the bottled water documentary "Tapped"; The song plays during several scenes near its end and over the credits. The song was also used in the trailer for the film Africa United and, in Argentina, the movie-channel Volver used the intro to the song for the Advertising Space ("Inicio y fin de espacio publicitario" in Spanish).

Legal proceedings
MGMT was involved in a legal dispute with the former President of France, Nicolas Sarkozy. Sarkozy's UMP party used the song on several occasions, before offering the band a €1 gesture. The band commented, "We believe that access to music benefits both the musicians and the fans, and has undoubtedly helped spread our music around the globe, while also expanding our personal musical collections", and that the reason they felt compelled to sue was because "the fact that the UMP used our song without permission while simultaneously pushing anti-piracy legislation seemed a little wack". Eventually, UMP reached an agreement on a €30,000 (US$38,000) settlement fee.

Cover versions and samples
An acoustic version of "Kids" was recorded by The Kooks in August 2008, to appear on the next volume of Triple J's cover compilation Like a Version. Another acoustic version by Australian singer Ben Lee appears on the bonus CD from his 2009 album The Rebirth of Venus.  Cage the Elephant covered the song as a b-side to their 2009 single Back Against the Wall.  DJ AM and Travis Barker also used the song on their mix tape album "Fix Your Face Vol.2: Coachella 09".  Sebastian Ingrosso sampled the song in his 2009 house song, "Kidsos".

The song has been covered live by Weezer (in a medley with "Poker Face" by Lady Gaga), Chiddy Bang, The Moth and the Mirror, Mac Miller, Dr Fox's Old Timey String Band, Jack's Mannequin, Our Lady Peace, Lady Danville, B.o.B, the band VIC , A Modest Proposal, Matt Hires, The Neon Rush, Chris Webby and Cage The Elephant.

As well as performing the song live, Chiddy Bang also sampled the song in "Opposite of Adults" from their 2009 mixtape The Swelly Express.

In 2010, the funeral death-doom band Ankhagram from Russia did a unique cover of the song on their 2010 full-length album, entitled "Where Are You Now".

Argentinian jazz singer Karen Souza included a cover of the song on her 2017 release Velvet Vault''.

Track listings

Charts

Weekly charts

Year-end charts

Sales and certifications

References

External links
 

2007 songs
2008 singles
American synth-pop songs
Columbia Records singles
MGMT songs
Number-one singles in Norway
Songs about childhood
Songs about children
Songs about nostalgia
Songs written by Andrew VanWyngarden
Songs written by Benjamin Goldwasser